Luca Barbareschi (born 28 July 1956 in Montevideo) is an Italian-Uruguayan actor, television presenter, and former member of the Italian Chamber of Deputies. Barbareschi is Jewish.

He was one of four actors whom the Italian police believed had been murdered in the making of the 1980 horror film Cannibal Holocaust, where he also abused and killed a young piglet. So realistic was the film that shortly after it was released its director Ruggero Deodato was arrested on suspicions of murder. The actors had signed contracts to stay out of the media for a year in order to fuel rumours that the film was a snuff movie. The court was only convinced that they were alive when the contracts were cancelled and the actors appeared on a television show as proof.

In 2008, he was elected as Member of the Italian Parliament at the Chamber of Deputies with Silvio Berlusconi's centre-right party The People of Freedom. In 2010 he joined, with other 32 deputies and 10 senators, the Gianfranco Fini's new party Future and Freedom. He left parliament in 2013.

On 28 August 2012 in Filicudi a similar event is repeated which sees Barbareschi attack again with kicks and punches the journalist Filippo Roma and hit his cameraman.

Filmography

Cinema
 
1977 - Ultimo mondo cannibale
1979 - Da Corleone a Brooklyn
1980 - Cannibal Holocaust as Mark
1983 - Dream of a Summer Night 
1984 - Impiegati
1986 - Via Montenapoleone
1987 - Private Affairs
1988 - Bye Bye Baby
1990 - In nome del popolo sovrano
1991 - L'amico arabo
1992 - La bionda
1992 - Obiettivo indiscreto
1994 - La delegazione
1995 - La tenda nera
1995 - La famiglia Ricordi
1995 - Il cielo è sempre più blu
1996 - Ardena
1999 - Le fils du Français
2002 - Il Trasformista
2008 - The International
2010 - Noi credevamo
2013 - Something Good (director, actor)
2019 - An Officer and a Spy (producer)
2023 - The Palace (producer)

Television
1992 - Questo è amore
1992 - That's Amore
1997 - Trenta righe per un delitto
1998 - Cronaca nera
1999 - Jesus
2000 - Greed
2002 - Giorni da leone
2003 - Una vita in regalo
2004 - Rivoglio i miei figli
2005 - Nebbie e delitti
2005 - Les Rois maudits
2006 - Giorni da leone 2
2006 - La profezia dei templari
2007 - Nebbie e delitti 2
2009 - Nebbie e delitti 3
2012 - Nero Wolfe (producer) 
2013 - Le Iene con Botte da Orbi
2015 - Pietro Mennea - La freccia del sud (fiction)

Theatre
2004 - Amadeus
2006 - Il Sogno del Principe di Salina, l'Ultimo Gattopardo

References

External links
Luca Barbareschi official site 

1956 births
Italian male film actors
Living people
Future and Freedom politicians
The People of Freedom politicians
20th-century Italian Jews
Jewish actors
21st-century Italian Jews